John Pascoe Grenfell (20 September 1800 – 20 March 1869) was a British officer of the Empire of Brazil. He spent most of his service in South America campaigns, initially under the leadership of Lord Cochrane and then Commodore Norton. He was the nephew of British politician Pascoe Grenfell and grandfather to General Sir John Grenfell Maxwell.  In Brazil, he rose to the rank of admiral and for his achievements was made a knight grand cross of the Imperial Order of the Rose and a knight of the Imperial Order of the Southern Cross.

Personal history

Early life
John Pascoe Grenfell was born in Battersea, Surrey on 20 September 1800 to John Maugham Grenfell and his wife Sophia Turner. In 1811 he entered the service of the British East India Company, and in 1819 he joined the Chilean Navy under Lord Cochrane. He took part in most of the conflicts undertaken by Lord Cochrane during the War of Chilean Independence, and rose to the rank of lieutenant. On 5 November 1820 Grenfell took part in the cutting out of the frigate Esmeralda and the following year in the pursuit of the Venganza and Prueba, the last major Spanish warships in the South Pacific. In 1823, he followed Lord Cochrane to Brazil, to fight in the Brazilian War of Independence. In August 1823, Grenfell now a Commander in the small brig Dom Miguel  sailed to Belem do Pará and using a similar tactic used by Lord Cochrane at Maranham, persuaded the Portuguese forces to surrender by making them think a larger fleet was in the offing. During the war with Argentina in 1826, he commanded the brig Caboclo as part of the squadron blockading Buenos Aires under (British) Commodore James Norton.  On 29 July, while engaged in a naval battle against the Argentine fleet, whose commander was admiral William Brown, he lost his right arm. He then returned to England to recuperate.

Later life

In 1828 Grenfell returned to Brazil, and during 1835–36 he commanded as Commodore a squadron of ships on the lakes of Rio Grande do Sul against the Farrapos rebels. He was successful in defeating his opponents and forcing the surrender of the insurgent forces. In 1841 he was promoted to rear-admiral and in 1846 was appointed Brazilian consul general in Liverpool. One of his principal tasks was to supervise the construction of the state-of-the-art steam frigate Dom Afonso, to the lines of HMS Fury. She was built by Thomas Royden And Co., of Liverpool with engines from Benjamin Hicks and Co., of Bolton. In 1848, when Dom Afonso was undergoing steam trials on the Mersey with Grenfell, the diplomatic corps and members of the Brazilian and French Royal families on board, the frigate rescued 160 passengers from the America bound immigrant ship Ocean Monarch which had caught fire one day out from Liverpool. The Brazilian government was so pleased with the performance of Dom Afonso that Grenfell was ordered to sign a contract for a second steam frigate called Amazonas.

In 1851, when war broke out between Brazil and Argentine dictator Rosas, Grenfell was posted back to Brazil to take command of their naval forces in the Río de la Plata. In December of that year at the Battle of Tonelero, with the Dom Afonso as his flagship, he successfully forced the passage of the Paraná River carrying a Brazilian army which combined with local forces to defeat Rosas. A grateful Brazilian Government recommended that he be made a Viscount, but the Emperor refused as Grenfell was not a Brazilian but had retained his British citizenship. He was however promoted to vice-admiral and then finally admiral and returned to Liverpool to resume his role as consul-general. In 1861, he attended the funeral of Lord Cochrane in  Westminster Abbey as the representative of the  Brazilian Government. He died in Paris in 1869.

Family

Grenfell married Maria Dolores Masini in Montevideo. They had eight children: John Granville (1829–1866), Maria Dolores (1831–?), Sophia (1833–1898), Maria Emma (1833–?), Alfred (1839–?), Flora (1841–1874), Harry Tremenheere (1845–1906) and Thomas Cochrane (1847–49).

Honors

Non-titled nobility honors 
 Grand Cross of Brazilian Order of the Rose.
 Officer of the Brazilian Order of the Southern Cross.

Military honors 
 Medal (oval) of the Independence War (Bahia).
 Medal (gold; blue ribbon) for the Battle of The Tonelero Passage .

References

Bibliography 

 
 
 

 Vale, Brian Cochrane in the Pacific: Fortune and Freedom in Spanish America, London, I B Tauris, 2008
 Vale, Brian Independence or Death! British Sailors and Brazilian Independence, London, I B Tauris, 1996
 Vale, Brian A War Betwixt Englishmen: Brazil against Argentina in the River Plate 1825-30, London, I B Tauris, 2000
Vale, Brian, 'Captain J P Grenfell of the Brazilian Navy in the River Plate', in The Naval Miscellany VIII, Navy Records Society, 2017

External links 

1800 births
1869 deaths
British admirals
People of the Chilean War of Independence
British amputees
People from Battersea
British people of Cornish descent
John Pascoe
Burials at Père Lachaise Cemetery
19th-century Brazilian military personnel
Military personnel from London